Veronica Sywak is an Australian actress. She was born in Sydney, Australia.

Biography
Sywak's film career began to gain momentum in 2007 when she landed the lead role in the Australian film The Jammed, for which she received an IF Award nomination (Best Actress) and an AFI Award nomination (Best Lead Actress).

In 2008, Sywak facilitated a screening of The Jammed at the United Nations in New York on behalf of the United Nations Office of Drugs and Crime. It marked the first Australian film to be screened at the United Nations.

Sywak has a Bachelor of Media and Communications degree from the University of New South Wales.

References

External links
 
 Veronica Sywak at infilm.com.au
 Veronica Sywak at australianscreen.com.au

Australian film actresses
Living people
Actresses from Sydney
University of New South Wales alumni
21st-century Australian actresses
Australian television actresses
1980s births
Year of birth missing (living people)